is a town located in Saitama Prefecture, in the central Kantō region of Japan. , the town had an estimated population of 13,414 in 6006 households and a population density of 520 persons per km2. The JAXA Earth Observation Center is located in Hatoyama.

Geography
Hatoyama is located at the geographic center of central Saitama Prefecture. Most of the town is located in the central part of the Iwadono Hills, with the town increasing in elevation from south to north. The eastern side of the town is urbanized due to highway and railway connections, which has resulted in the development of new towns. On the other hand, the northern and western parts of the town are not urbanized, and the scenery of the mountain village remains.

Surrounding municipalities
Saitama Prefecture
 Sakado
 Higashimatsuyama
 Ranzan
 Tokigawa
 Ogose
 Moroyama

Climate
Hatoyama has a Humid subtropical climate (Köppen Cfa) characterized by warm summers and cool winters with light to no snowfall.  The average annual temperature in Hatoyama is 13.8 °C. The average annual rainfall is 1746 mm with September as the wettest month. The temperatures are highest on average in August, at around 25.4 °C, and lowest in January, at around 2.3 °C.

Demographics
Per Japanese census data, the population of Hatoyama increased rapidly in the 1970s and 1980s before peaking around the year 2000. It has been in decline since then.

History
The village of Hatoyama was created on April 15, 1955 by the merger of the villages of Kamei and Imajuku. It was raised to town status on April 1, 1982.

Government
Hatoyama has a mayor-council form of government with a directly elected mayor and a unicameral town council of 12 members. Hatoyama, together with the towns of Ogose and Moroyama, contributes one member to the Saitama Prefectural Assembly. In terms of national politics, the town is part of Saitama 10th district of the lower house of the Diet of Japan.

Economy
The economy of Hatoyama is primarily agricultural, with rice predominating. Hitachi has a research facility located in Hatoyama.

Education
Tokyo Denki University – Hatoyama campus
Yamamura Gakuen College
Hatoyama has three public elementary schools and one public middle school operated by the town government, and one public high school operated by the Saitama Prefectural Board of Education.

Transportation
Hatoyama is not on any passenger train network or national highway. The nearest highway access point is the Tsurugashima Interchange on the Kan-Etsu Expressway in neighboring Tsurugashima.

References

External links

Official Website 

Towns in Saitama Prefecture
Hiki District, Saitama
Hatoyama, Saitama